The SCCA Hall of Fame is a Hall of Fame dedicated to enshrining those who have contributed the most to the Sports Car Club of America (SCCA) auto racing.

The Hall of Fame was announced in 2004, and the first 10 people were inducted in 2005.

List of inductees

2005
 Cameron Argetsinger
 A. Tracy Bird
 John Fitch
 Arthur Gervais
 Harry Handley
 Vern Jaques
 Bill Milliken
 Sue Roethel
 Art Trier
 Rob Walker

2006
 John Bornholdt
 John Buffum
 Mark Donohue
 Denise McCluggage
 Grant Reynolds
 Anthony DeMonte

2007
Marge Binks
Marc Gerstein
Carl Haas
General Curtis E. LeMay
Theodore F. Robinson

2008
Don and Ruth Nixon
Roger Johnson
Kjell Qvale
Robert Ridges
Fred Schmucker

2009
Bill Chambres
Bill Johnson
Jim Kimberly
Paul Newman
John Timanus

2010
Nick Craw
Briggs Cunningham
Woolf Barnato
Burdette “Berdie” Martin
Wayne Zitkus

2011
Karen Babb
John Bishop
Jim Fitzgerald
Tracer Racing
Harro Zitza

2012
Charlie Earwood
Jim Hall
Gene Henderson
Dr. Peter Talbot
Bryan Webb

2013
Skip Barber
Bill Noble
Bobby Rahal
Carroll Shelby
Andy Porterfield

2014
Kathy Barnes
Bob Bondurant
Dan Gurney
Dr. Robert Hubbard and Jim Downing
Pete Hylton

2015
Roger H. Johnson
Oscar Kovaleski
Ron Sharp
Dr. George Snively
Bob Tullius

2016
Hubert Brundage
Bob Henderson
Randy Pobst
Roger Penske
Alec Ulmann

2017 

 Pete Brock
 Dennis Dean
 Larry and Linda Dent
 Phil Hill
 Joe Huffaker Sr.
 Jim Kaser
 Lyn St. James

2018 

 William C. Bradshaw
 Peter Cunningham
 Janet Guthrie
 Augie Pabst
 Dave Stremming and Loren Pearson
 Bob Sharp
 Dr. Dick Thompson

2019 

 David Ammen
 Dr. Frank Falkner
 George Follmer
 Patc Henry
 John McGill
 Dorsey Schroeder
 Henryk Szamota

2020 

 Bill and Jane Goodale
 Walt Hansgen
 Scott Harvey
 Joe Huffaker
 Cat Kizer
 Bob and Patty Tunnell
 Dave and Sherrie Weitzenhof

2021 

 Tom Campbell
 John Fergus
 R. Bruce Gezon
 Lloyd Loring
 Donna Mae Mims

2022 

 Charlie Clark
 Hoard Duncan
 Paul Pfanner
 Greg Pickett
 Mark Weber

External links
SCCA Hall of Fame
SCCA Awards

Hall
Auto racing museums and halls of fame
Halls of fame in Kansas
Awards established in 2004
2004 establishments in the United States